The Spider's Web is a 1960 British mystery film directed by Godfrey Grayson and starring Glynis Johns, John Justin, Cicely Courtneidge and Jack Hulbert. It was an adaptation of the 1954 play Spider's Web by Agatha Christie, and a rare Technicolor 'A' feature from the Danzigers. It was remade as a television special starring Penelope Keith that was broadcast on 26 December 1982.

Plot
The story of an ambassador's wife who must hide the corpse of her stepdaughter's unlikeable stepfather from her husband, who is bringing important visitors to their country home.

Cast
 Glynis Johns as Clarissa Hailsham-Brown 
 John Justin as Henry Hailsham-Brown 
 Jack Hulbert as Sir Rowland Delahaye 
 Cicely Courtneidge as Miss Peake 
 Ronald Howard as Jeremy 
 David Nixon as Elgin 
 Wendy Turner as Pippa 
 Basil Dignam as Hugo 
 Joan Sterndale-Bennett as Mrs Elgin 
 Ferdy Mayne as Oliver 
 Peter Butterworth as Inspector Lord
 Anton Rodgers as Sergeant Jones
 Robert Raglan as Dr. Berry

Critical reception
TV Guide wrote, "an entertaining film version of Agatha Christie's 1954 stage play about a diplomat's wife who hides the corpse of her stepdaughter's father. Though there is no Miss Marple or Hercule Poirot to push this programmer along, it still moves at a lively pace."

References

External links

1960 films
1960s mystery films
British mystery films
Films directed by Godfrey Grayson
British films based on plays
Films based on works by Agatha Christie
Films shot at New Elstree Studios
Films set in England
United Artists films
1960s English-language films
1960s British films